Nabil Ejenavi (born 16 February 1994) is an Algerian professional footballer who plays as a midfielder.

On 4 July 2016, it was announced that Ejenavi's contract with Montana will be terminated by mutual consent.

On 24 October 2016, Ejenavi joined Oborishte Panagyurishte.

Honours

Club 
Montana

Bulgarian Cup:

 Runners-up (1): 2015-16

References

External links

1994 births
Living people
Algerian footballers
Algerian expatriate footballers
Association football midfielders
FC Istres players
ASO Chlef players
FC Montana players
FC Oborishte players
Ligue 2 players
Footballers from Marseille
First Professional Football League (Bulgaria) players
Expatriate footballers in Bulgaria
French sportspeople of Algerian descent
French people of Nigerian descent
Algerian people of Nigerian descent